Dinamo is a rural locality (a settlement) and the administrative center of Dinamovskoye Rural Settlement, Nekhayevsky District, Volgograd Oblast, Russia. The population was 965 as of 2010. There are 20 streets.

Geography 
Dinamo is located 23 km southwest of Nekhayevskaya (the district's administrative centre) by road. Kamensky is the nearest rural locality.

References 

Rural localities in Nekhayevsky District